68 Cadogan Square is a Grade II* listed house in Cadogan Square, London SW1.

The house was built in the British Queen Anne Revival style in 1878, and the architect was Richard Norman Shaw. It is now the location of Sussex House School.

It appears in the James Bond movies Skyfall (2012), and Spectre (2015).

References

External links
 
 Sussex House School website

Grade II* listed buildings in the Royal Borough of Kensington and Chelsea
Grade II* listed houses in London
Houses completed in 1878
Houses in the Royal Borough of Kensington and Chelsea
Queen Anne architecture in the United Kingdom
Richard Norman Shaw buildings